The CBC Sho (Japanese CBC賞) is a Grade 3 horse race for Thoroughbreds aged three and over, run in late June or early July over a distance of 1200 metres on turf at Chukyo Racecourse.

It was first run over the current distance in 1965 and has held Grade 3 status since 1984. The race was originally run over 1800 metres the distance was cut to 1400 metres in 1971 and again to 1200 metres in 1981. It was run at Kyoto Racecourse in 1993, Kokura Racecourse in 1999 and 2021 and Hanshin Racecourse in 2010 and 2011.

Winners since 2000

Earlier winners

 1984 - Happy Progress
 1985 - Nishino Eve
 1986 - Lead Triple
 1987 - St Caesar
 1988 - Toa Falcon
 1989 - Mystic Star
 1990 - Passing Shot
 1991 - Fame of Lass
 1992 - Yuki Top Run
 1993 - Toshi Green
 1994 - Nihon Pillow Prince
 1995 - Towa Winner
 1996 - Eishin Washington
 1997 - Sugino Hayakaze
 1998 - Masa Lucky
 1999 - Agnes World

See also
 Horse racing in Japan
 List of Japanese flat horse races

References

Turf races in Japan